Yavneh Academy may refer to:
Yavneh Academy (New Jersey) - Paramus, New Jersey
Yavneh Academy of Dallas
Yavneh Day School/Yavneh Hebrew Academy - Los Angeles